Château-Arnoux-Saint-Auban Airport  is an airport located  south-southwest of Château-Arnoux-Saint-Auban, in the Alpes-de-Haute-Provence département of the Provence-Alpes-Côte d'Azur region in France.

A campus of the École nationale de l'aviation civile (French civil aviation university) is located on the aerodrome.

References

External links 
 Aérodrome de Château-Arnoux - Saint-Auban at Union des Aéroports Français
 National Gliding Centre (Centre National de Vol à Voile)

Airports in Provence-Alpes-Côte d'Azur
Alpes-de-Haute-Provence